Mad Season is the second studio album by American rock band Matchbox Twenty. It was released on May 23, 2000, by Atlantic Records.

Recording and release
The album was a significant departure from the band's debut album, Yourself or Someone Like You, as it moved from a straight rock sound to poppier sounds and experimental rock. Mad Seasons sound is grander and more innovative than the band's previous album, as it includes orchestra and horn sections. While not as successful as its predecessor, the album entered and peaked at number three on the Billboard 200 with first week sales of 365,000 and was certified 4× Platinum in the United States in October 2001.

Track listing

Personnel
Matchbox Twenty
 Rob Thomas – lead vocals, piano, rhythm guitar
 Kyle Cook – lead guitar, backing vocals 
 Adam Gaynor – rhythm guitar, backing vocals
 Brian Yale – bass guitar
 Paul Doucette – drums, acoustic guitar on "Stop"

Additional musicians
 Angie Aparo – background vocals on "Stop"
 Peter Stuart – background vocals on "The Burn"
 Sam Bacco – percussion on "Last Beautiful Girl"
 Tony Adams – additional drums on "Stop"
 Matt Serletic – orchestra composer
 Nashville String Machine – string arrangements on "Rest Stop", "Leave", "You Won't Be Mine" and "Bed of Lies"
 Atlanta Brass Society – Horn arrangements on "If You're Gone" and "Black and White People"

Production
 Mark Dobson – additional engineering, Pro-Tools and digital editing
 David Thoener – mixing
 Shawn Grove – additional Pro-Tool editing, assistant engineering
 Robert Hannon – assistant engineering
 Greg Fogie – assistant engineering
 Kevin Szymanski – assistant engineering
 Stephen Marcussen – mastering
 Stewart Whitmore – mastering

Artwork
 Ria Lewerke, Doug Reichert, Paul Doucette, Imagic – art direction and design
 Michael Sowa – cover art
 Dean Karr – photography
 Andrew Macpherson – photography (center spread and page 19)

Charts

Weekly charts

Year-end charts

Decade-end charts

Certifications

References

2000 albums
Atlantic Records albums
Albums produced by Matt Serletic
Matchbox Twenty albums